Shon Jin-hwan (born September 30, 1968) is a retired male badminton player from South Korea.

Career
Shon attended Hannam University. He competed in badminton at the 1992 Summer Olympics in men's doubles with Lee Sang-bok. They lost in quarterfinals to Eddy Hartono and Rudy Gunawan, of Indonesia, 15-4, 18-15.

Achievements

IBF World Grand Prix 
The World Badminton Grand Prix sanctioned by International Badminton Federation (IBF) from 1983 to 2006.

Men's doubles

References

External links
 
 
 
 

1968 births
Living people
Badminton players at the 1992 Summer Olympics
Hannam University alumni
Olympic badminton players of South Korea
South Korean male badminton players
Asian Games medalists in badminton
Badminton players at the 1990 Asian Games
Asian Games bronze medalists for South Korea
Medalists at the 1990 Asian Games